Christiana "Mongol" Stancu (born July 19, 1991) is a Romanian mixed martial artist, karateka, boxer and kickboxer.

Early life
Christiana was raised in Bucharest, Romania, born from a professional bowling player (mother) and a jujitsu martial artist (father). She had an early start in both martial arts and painting, her second profession, when her parents observed her talents since she was only three years old. She began her career in combat sports at age 9 while painting in the same complex in the capital, the father of one of her colleagues painting being a martial arts coach. She retired from her Kyokushin karate career after 9 glamorous years, to begin developing in the art of Kempo, and then start her Kickboxing and MMA career, being the first woman in Romania to ever enter a cage and win and international World Title under Igor Vovchanchyn. Later, Christiana would also pursue her boxing career.

Fighting career

Kyokushin & Sei Budokai career

 2004 Kyokushin National Championship in Bucharest, Romania -45 kg Silver Medalist 
 2005 Sei Budokai National Championship in Bucharest, Romania -45 kg Gold Medalist 
 2006 Sei Budokai International Cup in Constanta, Romania -55 kg Gold Medalist 
 2006,2007,2008 Sei Budokai National Championship in Bucharest Romania -55 kg Gold Medalist 
 2007 Kyokushin National Championship Kumite & Kata in Bucharest, Romania -55 kg Gold Medalist 
 2007 Kyokushin World Women's Championships in Chiba, Japan -55 kg 8th place
 2008 Kyokushin National Championship Kumite in Bucharest, Romania -60 kg Gold Medalist 
 2008 Kyokushin National Championship Kata in Constanta, Romania Silver Medalist 
 2008 European Kyokushin Championships in Varna, Bulgaria Bronze Medalist 
 2009 Kyokushin National Championship Kumite in Bucharest Romania -65 kg Gold Medalist 
 2009 World Women's Championships Kyokushin Karate in Chiba, Japan

Kickboxing career

SUPERKOMBAT Fighting Championship career
On February 26, 2015 it was announced that will compete in the first ever women's fight in SUPERKOMBAT history, bout scheduled March 7 against Annalisa Bucci at SUPERKOMBAT World Grand Prix I 2015 in Ploiești, Romania.

Championships and accomplishments

Kickboxing

Boxing
 European Amateur Boxing Championships
 2014 Women's European Amateur Boxing Championships in Bucharest, Romania win to Guerrier Erika France and Apetz Nadine Germany, lost to Elena Vystropova -69 kg Bronze Medalist 
 World Amateur Boxing Championships
 2014 AIBA Women's World Boxing Championships in Jeju, South Korea -69 kg

Wushu
 World Wushu Championships
 2015 World Wushu Championships in Jakarta, Indonesia -70 kg Bronze Medalist

Mixed martial arts
 International Kempo Federation
 2015 Kempo Individual World Championship in Antalya, Turkey -65 kg Gold Medalist 
 2015 Kempo World Championships Forms, Kata in Antalya, Turkey Silver Medalist 
 2015 Kempo & WAC PRO ALLStyles BELT Women's World Championship in Vagos, Portugal -64 kg Gold Medalist 
 2014 IKF & FILA European Pankration Championships in Bucharest, Romania Silver Medalist 
 2013 Shidokan & Kempo World Championships in Tokyo, Japan Bronze Medalist 
 2012 IKF World MMA Championship in Tallinn, Estonia Semi-Professional Gold Medalist 
 2012 9th IKF World Kempo Championships in Antalya, Turkey -60 kg Gold Medalist     
 2012 IKF World Kempo Teams Championships in Torres Novas, Portugal Gold Medalist      
 2011 IKF World Kempo Teams Championships in Antalya, Turkey Gold Medalist   
 2011 1st IKF European Kempo MMA Championships in Yalta, Ukraine -65 kg Gold Medalist     
 2010 IKF World Kempo Championships in Antalya, Turkey Full-Contact Gold Medalist   
 2010 IKF World Kempo MMA Championships Gold Medalist

MMA RECORD

MMA record

|-
|-  bgcolor= "CCFFCC"
|-
|-  bgcolor="00FFFF"  
| 2015-11-28 || draw ||align=left| Maja Britvic || SUPERKOMBAT World Grand Prix 2015 || Turin, Italy || Decision (unanimous) || 3 || 5:00
|-
|-  bgcolor="CCFFCC"  
| 2012-05-26 || Win ||align=left| Valentina Borgognoni || WMMAF World Championship || Tallinn, Estony || TKO  || 2 || 5:00
|-
|-  bgcolor="CCFFCC"  
| 2012-07-27 || Win ||align=left| Jaqueline Ivanova || The battle for Russe || Russe, Bulgaria || TKO  || 1 || 3:00
|-
|-  bgcolor="CCFFCC"  
| 2011-06-25 || Win ||align=left| Baba Gabriela || Kempo MMA || Romania || Decision (2:1)  || 3 || 3:00
|- 
|-
| colspan=9 | Legend:

Kickboxing record

|-  bgcolor= "CCFFCC"
|2021-24-09 || Win ||align=left| Maria Scopinova || Fight4KO World Tournament World Muay Thay Title || Antalya, Turkey || Unanimous Decision || 3 || 3:00
|-  bgcolor= "#FFBBBB"
| 2018-12-14 || Loss ||align=left| Cristina Carusso || COLOSSEUM TOURNAMENT WAKO ORG IX || Timișoara, Romania || Split Decision || 5 || 3:00
|-  bgcolor= "CCFFCC"
| 2018-09-17 || Win ||align=left| Ibtissam Kassrioui || COLOSSEUM TOURNAMENT VIII || Bucharest, Romania || Split Decision || 3 || 3:00
|-  bgcolor= "CCFFCC"
| 2018-05-24 || Win ||align=left| Marleen Okx || COLOSSEUM TOURNAMENT TITANS BALKANS TITLE WMF & EUROPEAN TITLE EMC PRO || Bucharest, Romania || KO || 2 || 2:04
|-  bgcolor= "CCFFCC"
| 2018-02-23 || Win ||align=left| Katerina Abdalla || COLOSSEUM TOURNAMENT "THE BATTLE DANUBIUS" || Galati, Romania || TKO || 1 || 1:30
|-  bgcolor= "#FFBBBB"
| 2015-10-02 || Loss ||align=left| Angela Whitley || SUPERKOMBAT WORLD GRAND PRIX 2016 || Puerto Rico, USA || TKO  || 3 || 3:00
|-
|-  bgcolor= "CCFFCC"
| 2015-10-02 || Win ||align=left| Irene Martens || SUPERKOMBAT- WTKA World Title and WKA Intercontinental Title 2015 || Milan, Italy || Decision (unanimous) || 3 || 3:00
|-  bgcolor="CCFFCC"  
| 2015-08-01 || Win ||align=left| Jessica Puglisi || SUPERKOMBAT World Grand Prix IV 2015 || Constanța, Romania || Decision (unanimous) || 3 || 3:00    
|-
|-  bgcolor="CCFFCC"  
| 2015-05-23 || Win ||align=left| Songül Yılmaz || SUPERKOMBAT World Grand Prix II 2015 || Bucharest, Romania || Decision (unanimous) || 3 || 3:00  
|-
|-  bgcolor="#FFBBBB"
| 2015-03-07 || Loss ||align=left| Annalisa Bucci || SUPERKOMBAT World Grand Prix I 2015 || Ploiești, Romania || Decision || 3 || 3:00  
|-
|-  bgcolor="CCFFCC"
|2013-04-06 || Win ||align=left| Alina Georgescu || KING AUTO CUP 2013 || Bucharest, Romania || Decision (unanimous) || 3 || 3:00
|-
|-  bgcolor="CCFFCC"
| 2012-07-28 || Win ||align=left| Radovicescu Georgiana || FIGHTING SPORT REVOLUTION || Ilfov, Romania || Decision (2:1) || 3 || 3:00
|-  
|-  bgcolor="CCFFCC"
| 2012-03-17 || Win ||align=left| Alice Ardelean || KICKBOXING CHALLENGE || Sfantu Gheorghe, Romania || Decision (unanimous) || 3 || 3:00
|-
! style=background:white colspan=9 | 
|- 
|-
| colspan=9 | Legend:

Life

She's specialist in iconography. Some of her icons were sold over a thousand euros.

Christiana took part in several kyokushin and kempo events in Japan, where she met Ray Sefo, Jayson Vemoa or the coaches of Francisco Filho and Glaube Feitosa becoming friends with all and learning from them. Her models are Benny Urquidez, Chuck Norris, Fedor Emelianenko.  Portuguese champion José (Zé) Fortes also educated her on Muay Thai.

Other
Journalism

Along with her spouse, Christiana has created the Societies Magazine, a cultural magazine in Romania, with a general view over the Romanian society and the foreign societies Romania is interacting.
Also, she is the general editor for Sport Revolution Magazine, the best sports magazine in Romania.

Asian Games, Turkmenistan 2017.
Christiana was a special reporter for the Indoor and Martial Arts Games, held in Ashgabad, Turkmenistan.

Motivational Speeches

She has been invited to speak in different events about her success story both life and sport. Because of her great speaking talent she influences in a positive way many people. Since 2015, she has been invited to the TEDxTalks stage and becomes a professional speaker, inspiring people from everywhere through this unique combination of professions and intellectual concerns alike.

Painting
She became a graduate in theology, Sacred Art, Iconographic Painting, with the work "The three ways of worship of the Holy Apostle and Evangelist Luke", for which she obtained the grade A. She supports her sports activity by painting, her works being sold in her native country and abroad. 
In 2022 she opened her first personal painting exhibition called "One way" having an amazing critics review and selling all her paintings 

Prizes

-2015 Sports Person in Romania, awarded by Alexandrion Group

-2015 The Person of the Year in Sports, awarded by Cotidianul

-2016 Woman of the year, awarded by Lady Gala

-2018 Woman of the Year in Sports, awarded by DeBizz

-2020 The Jury's Choice Special Prize Woman of the Year by Lumina International and FUNDATIA PRETUIESTE VIATA

Filmography

She is noticed by the world of cinema, and in 2015 she films her first action role, the first music video in which she is the protagonist and obtains a contract as a stunt double for the main actress in an international film. In 2021, together with her husband, the historian and sports journalist, Octavian Budică, she is filming an independent project, Ter Chono - a Mongolian story, a short historical film that managed to collect international awards all over the world, in which Christiana plays the main role, that of the Mongolian warrior princess, Ter Chono. The film is based on an idea by Octavian Budică, who also produced the movie.

See also
List of female kickboxers

References

1991 births
Living people
Romanian sanshou practitioners
Romanian female karateka
Romanian female mixed martial artists
Mixed martial artists utilizing boxing
Mixed martial artists utilizing Kyokushin kaikan
Mixed martial artists utilizing Kenpo
Mixed martial artists utilizing sanshou
Romanian women boxers
Romanian female kickboxers
Lightweight kickboxers
SUPERKOMBAT kickboxers
Sportspeople from Bucharest